Penny Low is a Singaporean serial entrepreneur and former politician. A member of the People's Action Party (PAP), she was the Member of Parliament (MP) for the Pasir Ris–Punggol GRC for Punggol North from 25 October 2001 to 11 September 2015. She pioneered various movements and founded various enterprises and not-profit organisations like the Social Innovation Park and the Social Enterprise Association.

Career
From 1990 to 1993, Low worked at the Singapore Broadcasting Corporation (SBC) as a producer. She became a hitch hiker and travelled the world before returning to freelance as a producer. She worked as a financial Consultant and trainer since 1995, and anchored a television program on financial management and wealth planning. Low also worked as an adjunct lecturer for S'pore Institute of Management-Royal Melbourne Institute of Technology. In 2006, she founded Social Innovation Parks, a non-profit organisation supporting social entrepreneurs, and the Social Enterprise Association. Since then, she has been serving as the organisations' chief on a pro bono basis.

Low was led into public service by her lecturer in school and former Senior Minister of State Aline Wong. Low contested as a candidate for the  Pasir Ris–Punggol GRC, during the 2001 general elections under the People's Action Party. She served as a member of parliament for the group constituency, a position she held for three terms from 2001 to 2015 before she retired from politics.

Education
Low graduated from the National University of Singapore in 1990 and went on to obtain the Chartered Financial Consultant and Chartered Life Underwriter designation.

Personal life
Low is born in Singapore.

See also
 List of Singapore MPs
 List of current Singapore MPs

References

1967 births
Living people
National University of Singapore alumni
People's Action Party politicians
Members of the Parliament of Singapore
Singaporean women in politics